Gloom is a melancholy, depressing darkness, shade or despondent atmosphere.

Gloom may also refer to:

Games and comics
 Gloom (card game), a 2004 card game designed by Keith Baker
 Gloom (video game), a 1995 Doom clone for the Amiga computer
 Gloom (Pokémon), a fictional species in the Pokémon franchise
 The Gloom, a comic book by Tony Lee and Dan Boutlwood
 Gloom, a fictional Xavier Institute student in the X-Men comics

Music
 Gloom (album), by Macabre, 1989
 Gloom (EP), by Job for a Cowboy, 2011
 "Gloom", a song by Fireworks from Gospel, 2011